O Clássico ("The Classic") is the name given in football to matches between Portuguese clubs S.L. Benfica and FC Porto. Originally, the term O Clássico only referred to games played in the league, but now tends to include matches that take place in other domestic competitions such as the Taça de Portugal, Taça da Liga and Supertaça Cândido de Oliveira. Despite being the two most decorated Portuguese clubs in European football, with seven European titles between them, they have never faced each other in a European competition. Benfica and Porto are two of the three clubs known as the "Big Three" in Portugal, the other being Sporting CP.

The rivalry comes about as Lisbon and Porto are the two largest cities in Portugal, and both clubs are the most decorated football teams in Portugal.

Rivalry 

The first match between the Águias and the Dragões was an exhibition game that was played on the 28 April 1912, when Benfica defeated Porto 8–2. Eight years later, Porto would win their first Clássico, 3–2. Porto would have to wait another nine years to accumulate their second victory over Benfica. Prior to the establishment of the Primeira Liga in 1934, both Benfica and Porto were competing within their football league district. Both sides were also competing in the Campeonato de Portugal which later became in 1938 the Taça de Portugal.

Until 1934, Benfica would win the Campeonato de Lisboa nine times as well as triumphing in the Taça de Honra de Lisboa twice, while Porto would win the Campeonato do Porto nineteen times as well as claiming the Taça de Honra do Porto twice. Benfica would meet Porto for the very first time in an official match in the domestic cup competition which during the early periods of Portuguese football was the Campeonato de Portugal. Benfica defeated Porto in the final of the 1931 Campeonato de Portugal, 3–0 at the Campo do Arnado in Coimbra. Two goals from Vítor Silva and one from Augusto Dinis sealed the win to claim Benfica's second Campeonato de Portugal.

The inception of the Primeira Liga saw Porto win the very first edition of the competition. Both sides met for the first time in the competition on 3 February 1935, on which Porto won 2–1. Benfica would win the return tie 3–0. Despite Benfica's win, the Águias would finish third in the league, three points behind Porto. The next five seasons would see Benfica win three titles to Porto's two. During the 1940s, both sides would take a back seat to Sporting CP, which would win five league titles in the decade.

The late 1950s and 1960s saw Benfica dominate not just Portuguese football but also European football. The arrival of Eusébio saw Benfica secure eight league titles in ten years. Benfica's league titles were joined by two consecutive European Cups which were won in 1961, 3–2 against Barcelona, and in 1962, 5–3 against Real Madrid. The 1970s saw the continuation of Benfica's dominance up until the 1977–78 season, during which Porto won the league title for the first time in 19 years. The 1980s and early 1990s saw both Benfica and Porto battle for the league title. Porto's resurgence and the introduction of Jorge Nuno Pinto da Costa as chairman saw Porto reach new heights, winning the European Cup for the first time after defeating Bayern Munich 2–1 in the 1987 European Cup Final. Three years later, Benfica reached their eighth European final, the 1990 European Cup Final, losing 1–0 to Milan.

In the 1990s, Porto began to dominate Portuguese football, winning a record five consecutive league titles. The intensity between these two sides in the '90s was culminated by the fact that former Portuguese international teammates João Pinto, who played for Benfica, and Paulinho Santos, who played for Porto, publicly declared their dislike for each other. The new millennium saw a continuation of Porto's dominance. Porto would reach the heights of their 1987 European Cup final win after José Mourinho guided Os Dragões to the UEFA Cup in 2003 and the UEFA Champions League in 2004. Benfica won the league title in 2005 for the first time in over ten years to halter Porto's momentum. During the second half of the 2000s, both sides battled for top spot, with the rivalry intensified after Benfica's Cristian Rodríguez joined Porto in the summer of 2008 to become the third Benfica player in recent history to have made the switch. In 2010, after four seasons, Benfica won their 32nd league title. Also in 2010, Benfica defeated Porto 3–0 in the 2009–10 Taça da Liga final to win the first of what would be four straight Taça da Liga titles, a competition that Porto would only win in the 2022–23 edition against Sporting CP.

The next year, Porto recorded their biggest home win over As Águias, a 5–0 thrashing in a league fixture. Porto would secure a treble in the same season in which they claimed the league title, the Taça de Portugal as well as the UEFA Europa League. In 2013, Porto won their latest silverware: the Supertaça Cândido de Oliveira. On 18 May 2014, Benfica made history after achieving the domestic treble of winning the Primeira Liga, Taça de Portugal and Taça da Liga. Later on, Benfica secured four more league titles – four in a row and 37 overall, the latter a Portuguese record – and won another two league cups, achieving a record seventh overall. Porto and Benfica would go back-and-forth as league champions from the 2017–18 season through to the 2019–20 season. Porto are the current title holders in the 2021–22 season.

Honours comparison 
These are the major football honours of Benfica and Porto.

League matches 
The matches listed below are only Primeira Liga matches, club name in bold indicates win. The score is given at full-time, and in the goals columns, the goalscorer and time when goal was scored is noted.

Head-to-head results

Cup matches 
The matches listed below are only Taça de Portugal matches, club name in bold indicates win. The score is given at full-time, and in the goals columns, the goalscorer and time when goal was scored is noted.

Head-to-head results

League Cup matches 
The matches listed below are only Taça da Liga matches, club name in bold indicates win. The score is given at full-time, and in the goals columns, the goalscorer and time when goal was scored is noted.

Head-to-head results

Super Cup matches 
The matches listed below are only Supertaça Cândido de Oliveira matches, club name in bold indicates win. The score is given at full-time, and in the goals columns, the goalscorer and time when goal was scored is noted.

Head-to-head results

Campeonato de Portugal matches 
The matches listed below are only Campeonato de Portugal matches. The Campeonato de Portugal was created in 1922 and was the primary tournament in Portugal, where all teams competed from around the country. In 1938, the Campeonato de Portugal became what is now known as the Taça de Portugal. The club name in bold indicates win. The score is given at full-time and half-time (in brackets), and in the goals columns, the goalscorer and time when goal was scored is noted.

Head-to-head results

Reserve team matches 
Both Benfica's reserves, Benfica B, and Porto's reserves, Porto B, were established in the late 1990s. Both sides folded following the end of the 2005–06 season. The two teams were re-established in 2012 to compete in the 2012–13 Segunda Liga, where they met for the very first time.

Head-to-head results

Premier League International Cup 

Note: the match was played on neutral ground.

All-time head-to-head results 

This section does not include results between reserve teams and exhibition games.

Records and statistics 

 Biggest Benfica home win: Benfica 12–2 Porto (7 February 1943)
 Biggest Benfica away win: Porto 2–8 Benfica (28 May 1952, in the inauguration of Porto's Estádio das Antas)
 Most consecutive Benfica wins: 4 (12 September 1971 – 5 November 1972)
 Longest undefeated Benfica run: 7 (24 January 1982 – 8 December 1983)
 Most consecutive Benfica losses: 4 (10 February 2002 – 21 September 2003, 24 August 2019 – 23 December 2020)
 Most consecutive matches without Benfica winning: 9 (31 January 1988 – 17 April 1991)
 Biggest Porto home win: Porto 8–0 Benfica (28 May 1933)
 Biggest Porto away win: Benfica 0–5 Porto (18 September 1996)
 Most consecutive Porto wins: 4 (10 February 2002 – 21 September 2003, 24 August 2019 – 23 December 2020)
 Longest undefeated Porto run: 9 (31 January 1988 – 17 April 1991)
 Most consecutive Porto losses: 4 (12 September 1971 – 5 November 1972)
 Most consecutive matches without Porto winning: 7 (24 January 1982 – 8 December 1983)
 Most common result: 1–1 (14 times)

Most appearances 
Competitive matches only, includes appearances as used substitute.

Top goalscorers

Players who played for both clubs 

  Artur Augusto: Benfica 1915–21, 1923–25; Porto 1921–23
  Tavares Bastos: Benfica 1917–22; Porto 1922–24
  Francisco Ferreira: Porto 1937–38; Benfica 1938–52
  José Maria: Porto 1949–57; Benfica 1957–58
  Serafim: Porto 1960–63; Benfica 1963–67
  Paula: Porto 1959–66; Benfica 1966–68
  Artur Jorge: Porto 1964–65; Benfica 1969–75
  Abel: Benfica 1968–70; Porto 1970–76
  Carlos Alhinho: Porto 1976; Benfica 1976–77, 1978–81
  Romeu: Benfica 1975–77; Porto 1979–83
  Francisco Vital: Porto 1977–80; Benfica 1980–81
  Eurico Gomes: Benfica 1975–79; Porto 1982–87
  Eduardo Luís: Benfica 1975–76; Porto 1982–89
  Rui Águas: Benfica 1985–88, 1990–94; Porto 1988–90
  Dito: Benfica 1986–88; Porto 1988–89
  Paulo Futre: Porto 1984–87; Benfica 1993
  José Tavares: Porto 1990–91; Benfica 1994–95
  Sergei Yuran: Benfica 1991–94; Porto 1994–95
  Vasili Kulkov: Benfica 1991–94; Porto 1994–95
  Paulo Pereira: Porto 1988–94; Benfica 1994–96
  Fernando Mendes: Benfica 1989–91, 1992–93; Porto 1996–99
  Kenedy: Benfica 1993–96; Porto 1997–98
  Pedro Henriques: Benfica 1993–97; Porto 1997–98
  Basarab Panduru: Benfica 1995–98; Porto 1998–99
  Sergei Ovchinnikov: Benfica 1998–99; Porto 2000–02
  Ljubinko Drulović: Porto 1994–2001; Benfica 2001–03
  João Manuel Pinto: Porto 1995–2001; Benfica 2001–03
  Argel: Porto 1999; Benfica 2001–04
  Paulo Santos: Benfica 1993–94; Porto 2001–05
  Zlatko Zahovič: Porto 1996–99; Benfica 2001–05
  Emílio Peixe: Porto 1997–2002; Benfica 2002–03
  Tiago Pereira: Benfica 1997–98; Porto 2002–04
  Miklós Fehér: Porto 1998–2002; Benfica 2002–04
  Edgaras Jankauskas: Benfica 2002 (loan); Porto 2002–04
  Maniche: Benfica 1995–96, 1999–2002; Porto 2002–05
  Tomo Šokota: Benfica 2001–05; Porto 2005–07
  Marco Ferreira: Porto 2003–04; Benfica 2006–07
  Derlei: Porto 2002–05; Benfica 2007 (loan)
  Cristian Rodríguez: Benfica 2007–08 (loan); Porto 2008–12
  César Peixoto: Porto 2002–07; Benfica 2009–12
  Maxi Pereira: Benfica 2007–15; Porto 2015–19
  Nicolás Otamendi: Porto 2010–14; Benfica 2020–present

Sergei Yuran and Maxi Pereira are the only players who have scored a goal for both sides in O Clássico. Nicolás Otamendi is the only player to be sent off for both clubs.

Managers who managed both clubs

  János Biri: Porto 1935–36; Benfica 1939–47
  Lippo Hertzka: Benfica 1936–39; Porto 1942–45
  Béla Guttmann: Porto 1958–59, 1973; Benfica 1959–62, 1965–66
  Otto Glória: Benfica 1954–59, 1968–70; Porto 1964–65
  Elek Schwartz: Benfica 1964–65; Porto 1969–70
  Fernando Riera: Benfica 1962–63; 1966–68; Porto 1972–73
  Tomislav Ivić: Porto 1988–89, 1993–94; Benfica 1992
  Artur Jorge: Porto 1984–87, 1988–91; Benfica 1994–95
  José Mourinho: Benfica 2000; Porto 2002–04
  Fernando Santos: Porto 1998–2001; Benfica 2006–07
  Jesualdo Ferreira: Benfica 2001–03; Porto 2006–10

See also 

 Derby de Lisboa
 FC Porto–Sporting CP rivalry
 List of association football club rivalries in Europe

References

External links 
Benfica official website 
FC Porto official website 

Football rivalries in Portugal
S.L. Benfica
FC Porto
Nicknamed sporting events